America's Next Top Model (cycle 5) was the fifth cycle of America's Next Top Model. Janice Dickinson was replaced by Twiggy and Nolé Marin was replaced by J. Alexander. The prizes for this cycle were:

 A contract with Ford Models.
 A spread and cover in Elle Girl magazine.
 A 100,000 contract with CoverGirl cosmetics.

The destination during this cycle was London, England. This was the show’s only visit to the British Isles and the first visit to a primarily English-speaking international destination. The London bombings disrupted filming and had to be suspended for a few days. However, the final runway show was moved to Los Angeles for safety reasons.

The cast size was reduced from 14 to 13, which was maintained up until cycle 10. The house that the girls stayed in for the first half of the competition was later used for the first season of the VH1 show Rock of Love with Bret Michaels.

The winner was 19-year-old Nicole Linkletter from Grand Forks, North Dakota with Nik Pace placing as the runner-up.

Sixth-placer Lisa D'Amato would later claim victory as the winner of cycle 17: All-Stars.

Contestants

(Ages listed are at start of contest)

Episodes

Summaries

Call-out order

 Eliminated
 Quit the competition
 Part of a non-elimination bottom two
 Won the competition

Bottom two

 Eliminated after their first time in the bottom two
 Eliminated after their second time in the bottom two
 Eliminated after their third time in the bottom two
 Eliminated after their fifth time in the bottom two
 Quit the competition
 Eliminated in the final judging and placed as the runner-up

Average  call-out order
Casting call-out order and final two are not included.

Post–Top Model careers

 Ashley Black has modeled for hair care. She is now an on-air personality for 93 Rock.
 Lisa D'Amato signed to L.A. Models and MI Models under the talent division, modeled for various brands, and has released two recording singles. She has been featured in the third season of Celebrity Rehab with Dr. Drew, In addition, she was the winner of cycle 17, an all-star season that featured past competitors.
 Diane Hernandez is signed to Wilhelmina Models and has been featured in Silhouette, Marianne, and Vogue.it.
 Kyle Kavanagh has done some modeling in Los Angeles.
Nicole Linkletter is currently signed with Nous Model Management in L.A., Upfront Models in Singapore, Models in Hong Kong and Agence Presse in Tokyo, and L.A. Models runway division, Paragon Model Management in Mexico, and SMG Models.
 Nik Pace has signed with Fusion Model Management, modeled for Snuggle, Black Men, Metro Pop, Wedding Dresses, Request Jeans, Dirty Sexy Money, Us Weekly, Soft Sheen Carson, Enigma Hair Salon and is featured in her own calendar. She is now signed with Ford, and was featured in a hair styling video by Ford Models. In September 2009, she gave birth to a boy.
  Sarah Rhoades has returned to her career as a ballet dancer and works as a company artist for the Atlanta Ballet. She has done some test shots.
 Jayla Rubinelli has modeled for New York couture, Ganett, Zitomer, Burn Suburbia Clothing, Great Guns 2008 Calendar, Tucson Lifestyle, and HIN Girls between others.
 Bre Scullark has signed to Ford Models in New York, Los Angeles, Miami and Chicago and appeared in commercials and print advertisements., In addition, she has participated in America's Next Top Model, cycle 17, an all-star cycle featuring past competitors, where she placed 10th.
 Kim Stolz signed to Elite Model Management and modeled for various brands and magazines before putting her modeling career on hold to become a correspondent for MTVu. She has done celebrity modeling and has signed with Ford Models. Since retired from modeling and television industry, Stolz shifted to become a bank intern, first at Citigroup and Bank of America.
 Ebony Taylor has walked in various fashion weeks, but turned away from a career in modeling to return to college.  She competed in the 2010 Miss California pageant and won one of three preliminary evening dress awards. She also supported her sister Angel Taylor when she auditioned for The Voice.
 Cassandra Whitehead has worked with UPN and has done some television acting. She also appeared in films such as Fast & Furious (2009) and 2 Dudes and a Dream (2009) and later appeared on 1 vs. 100 and won $500,000. She married Canadian actor Stephen Amell on December 25, 2012, while on a vacation in the Caribbean.
 Coryn Woitel has modeled for FingerHut.

References

External links
 

A05
2005 American television seasons
Television shows filmed in California
Television shows shot in London